MagicPoint is one of several open-source presentation programs, often used to produce slides for conferences. Unlike most presentation programs, such as Microsoft PowerPoint, where a GUI is used to create slides, MagicPoint slides are created by writing text files using a simple markup language. The resulting file is then displayed with MagicPoint's X11-based viewer.

History 
MagicPoint was originally created in the autumn of 1997, at a WIDE Project camp. It was originally known as tp, standing for TinyPoint, but in December the name was changed to MagicPoint.

Features 
 Content is written in text files and formatting is indicated by text features. For example, different level bullet points can be created by simply indenting the text with tabs
 Many image formats are supported
 Slides can be scaled to different screen sizes
 External applications can be executed from inside the presentation
 A talk timer and slide guide are included
 Presentations can be exported to HTML or PostScript files.
Another feature of MagicPoint is the ability to draw on slides during a presentation. By pressing x on the keyboard, the slide can temporarily be scribbled on with red "ink". Shift x allows you to cycle through other pen colours.

References

External links 
 Official homepage
 Short review and tutorial
 Primer and Syntax

Free presentation software